The fourth season of the Australian police-drama Blue Heelers premiered on the Seven Network on 10 February 1997 and aired on Tuesday nights at 8:30 PM. The 42-episode season concluded 25 November 1997.

Casting
Main cast for this season consisted of:
 John Wood as Sergeant Tom Croydon [full season]
 Julie Nihill as Christine 'Chris' Riley [full season]
 Martin Sacks as Senior Detective Patrick Joseph 'P.J.' Hasham [full season]
 Lisa McCune as Constable Margaret 'Maggie' Doyle [full season]
 William McInnes as Senior Constable Nicholas 'Nick' Schultz [full season]
 Damian Walshe-Howling as Constable Adam Cooper [full season]
 Tasma Walton as Probationary Constable Deirdre 'Dash' McKinley [full season]

Semi-regular cast members for this season included:
 Peta Doodson as Senior Sergeant → Inspector Monica Draper
 Beth Buchanan as Susan Croydon
 Michael Isaacs as Clancy Freeman
 Axl Taylor as Len the barman
 Dennis Miller as Ex-Sergeant Pat Doyle
 Jeremy Kewley as Tony Timms
 Reg Evans as Keith Purvis
 Terry Gill as Chief Superintendent Clive Adamson
 Karen Davitt as Doctor Zoe Hamilton
 Rachel Blakely as Gina Belfanti
 Don Bridges as Charlie Clarke
 Marie Trevor as Lelia Clegg
 Pauline Terry-Bietz as Beth McKinley
 Neil Pigot as Inspector Russell Falcon-Price
 Adam May as Ellis Corby
 Peter Aanensen as Merv Poole
 Kevin Harrington as Charlie McKinley
 Kate Atkinson as Stacey Norse
 Stuart Baker as "Richo"
Notable guest actors this season included Anne Phelan, Stefan Dennis, Vincent Gil, Alan Dale, Peta Brady, Brett Climo, Wendy Strehlow, Fiona Corke and Lesley Baker.

In the episode, "Fool For Love", Jane Allsop guest starred. She impressed the producers so much that they would later invite her back to the show in a main role as Jo Parrish.

Reception 

The 1997 Season was the highest rating for the show; was the number one show on Australian Television for that year: Averaging a mammoth 2,441,000 in the five cities for the year.

Two of the most popular episodes remain the two-parter "Gold" and "Fool's Gold", in which PJ and Maggie are trapped down a mine shaft and release their sexual tension.

Awards

Episodes

DVD release

References

General
 Zuk, T. Blue Heelers: 1997 episode guide, Australian Television Information Archive. Retrieved 1 August 2007.
 TV.com editors. Blue Heelers Episode Guide – Season 4, TV.com. Retrieved 1 August 2007.
Specific

Blue Heelers seasons
1997 Australian television seasons